Yamoto may refer to:

 Yamoto Station, a JR East railway station in Higashi-Matsushima, Miyagi, Japan
 Yamoto Tamura (born 1979), Japanese national champion figure skater
 Yamoto River, one of the rivers that forms the Tsurumi River in Japan
 The former town of Yamoto, Miyagi, now part of Higashimatsushima

See also 
 Yamato (disambiguation)